Puerto Acosta Municipality is the first municipal section of the Eliodoro Camacho Province in the  La Paz Department in Bolivia. Its seat is Puerto Acosta. At the time of census 2001 the municipality had a population of 27,296, still including Umanata and Escoma as cantons.

Cantons 
There are four cantons in the municipality: Puerto Acosta, Parajachi, Chiñaya and San Juan de Cancanani.
Until 2009 the municipality consisted of nine cantons (cantones):

On February 6, 2009  Umanata Municipality became the fourth municipal section of the Eliodoro Camacho Province with Umanata as its seat and Escoma Municipality became the fifth one with Escoma as its seat. The four cantons Escoma, Villa Puni, Collasuyo and Challapata Peninsula (Península de Challapata), formerly cantons of the Puerto Acosta Municipality, today make up the Escoma Municipality.

References

External links 
 Population data of Puerto Acosta Municipality in 2001 and map (still including Escoma Canton and Umanata Canton)

Municipalities of La Paz Department (Bolivia)